Bernard Brodeur (born April 10, 1956 in Granby, Quebec) is a former member of the National Assembly of Quebec for Shefford.

Bernard Brodeur is a notary. He holds a bachelor's degree in Law and Notarial Law from the Université Laval. He is also the owner of a Limousin cattle breeding operation since 1985. He was chair of the Import-Export Committee of the Canadian Limousin Association from 1986 to 1987 and President of the Québec Limousin Breeders Association from 1989 to 1991.

Elected as Member for Shefford in the by-election held on February 28, 1994, Bernard Brodeur was reelected in the 1994, 1998 and 2003 general elections. He was the Official Opposition Critic for Transport. In 2004, Quebec Premier Jean Charest made him Chair of the Committee on Culture.

Brodeur was defeated for re-election in the 2007 general election by ADQ candidate François Bonnardel. Bonnardel received 16,648 votes versus Brodeur's 10,897 votes.

External links

Electoral record

1956 births
Living people
People from Granby, Quebec
Quebec Liberal Party MNAs
Université Laval alumni
21st-century Canadian politicians